Magnetic energy and electrostatic potential energy are related by Maxwell's equations. The potential energy of a magnet or magnetic moment  in a magnetic field  is defined as the mechanical work of the magnetic force (actually magnetic torque) on the re-alignment of the vector of the magnetic dipole moment and is equal to: 

while the energy stored in an inductor (of inductance ) when a current  flows through it is given by:

This second expression forms the basis for superconducting magnetic energy storage.

Energy is also stored in a magnetic field. The energy per unit volume in a region of space of permeability  containing magnetic field  is:

where the integral is evaluated over the entire region where the magnetic field exists.

For a magnetostatic system of currents in free space, the stored energy can be found by imagining the process of linearly turning on the currents and their generated magnetic field, arriving at a total energy of:

This is analogous to the electrostatic energy expression ; note that neither of these static expressions apply in the case of time-varying charge or current distributions.

References

External links
 Magnetic Energy, Richard Fitzpatrick Professor of Physics The University of Texas at Austin.

Forms of energy
Magnetism